Ellwangen station is a railway station in the municipality of Ellwangen, located in the Ostalbkreis district in Baden-Württemberg, Germany.

References

Railway stations in Baden-Württemberg
Buildings and structures in Ostalbkreis